You, Me and He is a 1984 album by R&B group Mtume.  This was their fourth album released on the Epic Records label. The title track was interpolated by Aaliyah for her remixes of her cover of "(At Your Best) You Are Love", originally by The Isley Brothers

Track listing

In 2012 the label Funky Town Grooves re-released the album with additional tracks:

Personnel
Mtume - backing vocals
James Mtume - keyboards, lead vocals, backing vocals
Tawatha Agee -  lead vocals, guitar, backing Vocals
Curt Jones - guitar, backing vocals
Kevin Robinson - guitar, backing vocals 
Clarence "Binky" Brice - guitar
Ira Siegel - rhythm guitar
Raymond Jackson - bass, guitar, synthesizer
Philip Field - keyboards, synthesizers, synth programming, backing vocals
Steve "Bam" Becker - drums
Bernie Worrell, David Frank, Dunn Pearson - synthesizer
Frank Elmo, Jimmy Heath, Stan Harrison - horns
Gary "Bone" Cooper - backing vocals
Angel Colon, Kirth Atkin - scratches
Vincent Henry - saxophone solo on "You Are My Sunshine"
Sonny Fortune - saxophone solo on "You, Me, and He" and "To Be or not to Bop That is the Question (Whether We Funk or Not)"
Ed "Tree" Moore - guitar solo on "I Simply Like"

Charts

Singles

References

External links
 Mtume-You, Me And He at Discogs

Mtume albums
1984 albums
Epic Records albums